The Whetstone River is a  tributary of the Minnesota River, in northeastern South Dakota and a very small portion of western Minnesota in the United States.  Via the Minnesota River, it is part of the watershed of the Mississippi River.

Course
It enters the Minnesota River at Ortonville, Minnesota, about 0.25 mi (0.4 km) after crossing the state line and just downstream of the Minnesota's emergence from Big Stone Lake.

At Big Stone City, the river has a mean annual discharge of 69 cubic feet per second.

Upstream of Big Stone City, the river collects two tributaries, the North Fork Whetstone River and the South Fork Whetstone River, each of which rises on the Coteau.  The North Fork flows southeastward from Roberts County and passes near the town of Wilmot.  The South Fork flows westward in Grant County and passes the town of Milbank.

See also
List of rivers of Minnesota
List of rivers of South Dakota

References

Columbia Gazetteer of North America entry
DeLorme (1994).  Minnesota Atlas & Gazetteer.  Yarmouth, Maine: DeLorme.  .
DeLorme (2001).  South Dakota Atlas & Gazetteer.  Yarmouth, Maine: DeLorme.  .

Rivers of Minnesota
Rivers of South Dakota
Rivers of Big Stone County, Minnesota
Rivers of Grant County, South Dakota
Rivers of Roberts County, South Dakota
Tributaries of the Minnesota River